Bernard Brocas may refer to:

Bernard Brocas (soldier and MP) (1330–1395), army commander and MP
Bernard Brocas (rebel) (c. 1354–1400), English rebel executed for treason
Bernard Brocas (16th century MP), MP for Buckingham in 1558